Lassiter v. Northampton County Board of Elections, 360 U.S. 45 (1959), was a case challenging the constitutionality of the rule of Northampton County, North Carolina requiring potential voters to pass a literacy test to vote, appealed from the Supreme Court of that state.

Opinion
The opinion of the court, delivered by Justice William O. Douglas, held that provided the tests were applied equally to all races, were not "merely a device to make racial discrimination easy," and did not "contravene any restriction that Congress, acting pursuant to its constitutional powers, has imposed," the literacy test could be an allowable use of the state's power to "determine the conditions under which the right of suffrage may be exercised."

In practice, such tests were administered by white voting officials in a discriminatory manner to disfranchise minorities. Given the results from states' using such devices for decades, Congress subsequently prohibited the use of such tests under the Voting Rights Act of 1965, drafted to protect citizens' constitutional rights to vote and provide federal oversight.

See also
 Civil Rights Movement
 Disenfranchisement after the Reconstruction Era

External links
 
 

United States elections case law
United States Supreme Court cases
Northampton County, North Carolina
African-American history of North Carolina
History of voting rights in the United States
North Carolina elections
1959 in United States case law
United States Supreme Court cases of the Warren Court
Civil rights movement case law